was a private junior college in Chigasaki, Kanagawa, Japan. It was established in 1953。In 1985 this Campus was moved to Chigasaki, Kanagawa from Shinagawa, Tokyo.This college was abolished in 2011.

Academic departments 
 Academic departments  of Food nurtrution

See also 
 List of junior colleges in Japan

External links
  

Japanese junior colleges